Lionel Oxenham (27 January 1888 – 10 January 1970) was an Australian cricketer. He played in twenty-three first-class matches for Queensland between 1919 and 1928.

See also
 List of Queensland first-class cricketers

References

External links
 

1888 births
1970 deaths
Australian cricketers
Queensland cricketers
Cricketers from Brisbane